The 2012 Norwegian Women's Cup was the 35th season of the Norwegian annual knockout football tournament for women. The tournament started on 8 May 2012, and ended on 24 November 2012 with the final. The defending champions are Stabæk which beat Røa in the last year's final on penalties.

After playing the last three finals in Telenor Arena, the Football Association of Norway announced on 6 June 2012 that this year's final will be played on Åråsen Stadion.

Stabaek won the final 4-0 over Roa.

First round

|colspan="3" style="background-color:#97DEFF"|8 May 2012

|}

Second round

|colspan="3" style="background-color:#97DEFF"|5 June 2012

|}

Third round

|colspan="3" style="background-color:#97DEFF"|27 June 2012

|}

Quarter-finals

Semi-finals

Final

References

External links
Season at soccerway.com

Norwegian Women's Cup seasons
Norwegian Women's Cup
Cup